Victor Hugo Ferreyra (born 24 February 1964 in Río Tercero) is an Argentine former footballer who played as a striker.
He played for a number of clubs in Argentina including San Lorenzo and also Dundee United in Scotland. He also made two appearances for Argentina in 1991.

His time in Scotland was controversial due to his spitting on Jim Duffy in a game against Dundee F.C.

Ferreyra's other clubs included Racing de Córdoba, Belgrano de Córdoba, Estudiantes, Talleres de Córdoba, Argentinos Juniors and Douglas Haig

Club statistics

National team statistics

References

External links

 Argentine Primera statistics (post 1990)  

1964 births
Living people
Sportspeople from Córdoba Province, Argentina
Argentine footballers
Argentine expatriate footballers
Racing de Córdoba footballers
San Lorenzo de Almagro footballers
Dundee United F.C. players
Club Atlético Belgrano footballers
Estudiantes de La Plata footballers
Talleres de Córdoba footballers
Argentinos Juniors footballers
Argentina international footballers
Expatriate footballers in Scotland
Expatriate footballers in Japan
Urawa Red Diamonds players
Argentine Primera División players
J1 League players
Scottish Football League players
Argentine expatriate sportspeople in Scotland
Argentine expatriate sportspeople in Japan
Association football forwards